Cuffley railway station serves the village of Cuffley in the Welwyn Hatfield district of Hertfordshire. It also serves other nearby settlements, namely Goffs Oak, Northaw and the west of Cheshunt.

The station opened in 1910 on the Hertford Loop Line between Enfield Chase and Hertford North as Cuffley and Goff's Oak, with the suffix being dropped some time later. The opening of the station allowed Cuffley to expand as an attractive commuter village with regular services to London King's Cross, and Broad Street (replaced by Northern City Line trains to Moorgate in 1976). Cuffley was served by steam locomotives until 1960 when they were replaced by diesels; the line was electrified in 1976.

The station, and all trains serving it, are operated by Great Northern.

Services 
All services at Cuffley are operated by Great Northern using  EMUs.

The typical off-peak service in trains per hour is:
 2 tph to 
 2 tph to  via 

During the peak hours, the station is served by an additional half-hourly service between Moorgate and Hertford North.

References

External links

Railway stations in Hertfordshire
Former Great Northern Railway stations
Railway stations in Great Britain opened in 1910
Railway stations served by Govia Thameslink Railway
railway station